24-Ethyl coprostanol (24-ethyl 5β-cholestan-3β-ol) is a 29 carbon stanol formed from the biohydrogenation of β-sitosterol (24-ethyl cholest-5en-3β-ol, 24-ethyl cholesterol) in the gastrointestinal tract of most higher animals, especially herbivores. This compound has been used as a biomarker for the presence of agricultural (non-human) faecal matter in nature.

References

Steroids